Wo Tin is a village of Mui Wo, on Lantau Island, Hong Kong.

Location
Wo Tin is located in the vicinity of Silvermine Cave in Mui Wo.

References

External links
 Delineation of area of existing village Wo Tin (Mui Wo) for election of resident representative (2019 to 2022)
 1955 photograph of Wo Tin

Villages in Islands District, Hong Kong
Mui Wo